Ambra may refer to:

 AMBRA Computer Corporation, a discontinued wholly owned subsidiary of IBM
 Ämbra, a village in Kareda Parish, Järva County, in northern-central Estonia
 Ambra grisea, ambergris
 Ambra Health, a company with software for medical image sharing
 Italian submarine Ambra
 Ambra Angiolini (born 1977), Italian TV host, singer, and actress
 Ambra Medda, design consultant
 Ambra Senatore (born 1976), Italian choreographer, researcher and educator